Second-seeded Juan Mónaco was the defending champion, but first-seeded Nikolay Davydenko defeated him 6–2, 2–6, 6–2, in the final.

Seeds

Draw

Finals

Top half

Bottom half

External links
 Association of Tennis Professionals (ATP) singles draw
 Association of Tennis Professionals (ATP) qualifying draw

Singles